David MacNish ( 1812 – 10 April 1863) was a New Zealand interpreter, labourer, bricklayer, farmer and Pākehā Māori. He was born in Trelawny Parish, Jamaica in 1812 or 1813, the son of a Scottish-born estate overseer and a slave woman of mixed British and African ancestry - so he was also a slave, until manumitted by his father in 1820.

He was educated in Scotland and England, and travelled to India and Australia before settling in New Zealand at Raglin Harbour and marrying Te Ani, the daughter of the local paramount chief, Te Moanaroa. They had seven children, all of whom went by the slightly altered surname, McNeish.

References

1807 births
1863 deaths
New Zealand farmers
Interpreters
Scottish emigrants to New Zealand
Pākehā Māori
19th-century translators
Jamaican emigrants to New Zealand
People from Raglan, New Zealand
People from Trelawny Parish
Linguists from Jamaica